Krista Katariina Tervo (born 15 November 1997 in Kotka) is a Finnish athlete specialising in the hammer throw. She finished fourth at the 2016 World U20 Championships and ninth at the 2017 European U23 Championships.

Her personal best in the event is 74.40 metres set in Leiria in March 2022. This is also the current national record.

International competitions

References

1997 births
Living people
Finnish female hammer throwers
People from Kotka
Finnish Athletics Championships winners
World Athletics Championships athletes for Finland
Athletes (track and field) at the 2020 Summer Olympics
Olympic athletes of Finland
Sportspeople from Kymenlaakso
20th-century Finnish women
21st-century Finnish women